William Torrance (born 13 May 1946) is a Scottish broadcaster and entertainer who is known for hosting The Beechgrove Garden on BBC Scotland throughout the 1990s, Torrance was also a presenter on Dundee radio station Tay 2.

William Torrance is also an Honorary Vice President of the Scottish Society for Prevention of Cruelty to Animals (SSPCA), which he supports and actively campaigns for improved animal welfare standards.

When his show on Tay 2 ended in 2014, Torrance moved to France.

References

External links
 

1946 births
Living people
People from Ayrshire
Scottish radio personalities
Scottish television personalities